Blackfly, black-fly, or black fly may refer to:
Black fly, a fly of the family Simuliidae
Blackfly (TV series), a 2001 Canadian comedy series
Blackfly (film), a 1991 animated short based on the Wade Hemsworth song
Black bean aphid (Aphis fabae)
Opener BlackFly, an electric ultralight aircraft design

See also
"The Black Fly Song", a song written by Wade Hemsworth

Animal common name disambiguation pages